Bob Goodson is a British technologist, entrepreneur, and UX designer.   The CEO of Quid Inc., an artificial intelligence company, Goodson studied medieval literature at Oxford University, and co-founded Quid based on his interest in applying language theory to semantic search.

Early life and education
Goodson grew up in West Beckham Norfolk, England. He taught himself to program as a child, and started writing programs for video games at 8. In 1998, as he completed his final year of high school,  he received a Norfolk Scholars Award, which recognizes high achieving students from backgrounds traditionally less likely to go to university.

Goodson began college in 1999 at the University of East Anglia. He graduated with honors in 2002 with a degree in English literature and philosophy. He subsequently received a scholarship from the UK Arts and Humanities Research Board, one of only 10 scholarships in the country available in his field, and began postgraduate studies in medieval literature and language theory at University College, Oxford. His graduate research focused on the analysis of medieval cento.

Goodson had started several businesses before he began college, and while at UEA, he started a yoga club, a design company, Inspired, and a publishing company, Prana. In 2002, Goodson co-founded Oxford Entrepreneurs, a student society designed to connect scientists with business-minded students to support and facilitate entrepreneurship. He  served as the organization's founding chairman.

In November 2003, PayPal co-founder Max Levchin and other Silicon Valley executives spoke at an Oxford Entrepreneurs event. At a dinner Goodson hosted for the speakers, Levchin discussed the entrepreneurial ecosystem of the Valley. Goodson, then 23, saw an opportunity to bring his interests in language, technology, and business together. "Blown away by learning about those businesses," Goodson flew to Palo Alto, where he had lunch with Levchin and Peter Thiel. Levchin offered him a job as the lead designer within a startup incubator, and six months after their initial meeting at Oxford, Goodson took a sabbatical and moved to San Francisco.

Career
In April 2004, Goodson began working with Levchin at Midtown Doornail (an anagram of World Domination) as a product manager. An investment company and incubator, Midtown Doornail helped to create several successful internet companies, including Yelp. In September 2004, Goodson became Yelp's first employee. He remained at the company for four years, serving in various roles related to product management, UX and UI design and business development.

 In September 2007, Goodson founded YouNoodle with Kirill Makharinsky, an Oxford-trained mathematician, and Rebecca Hwang, an MIT graduate and Stanford Ph.D. candidate in network theory. The company was first funded by Levchin, Thiel's Founders Fund, and Charles Lho, among others. Collecting data on 3,000 companies through venture capitalists and academic research to identify factors that would predict a startup's success, the company's main product was the Start Up Predictor. A controversial tool, it was both embraced and disparaged. While the investment community “cautiously welcomed the Start Up Predictor,” it was criticized by investors such as Deborah Meaden, who said “it appeared a useful additional tool but a computer programme would never replace gut instinct when it came to deciding whether to invest”.

In September 2010, Goodson and physicist Sean Gourley co-founded Quid Inc. “I was interested in creating something that didn't exist and wasn't possible in any other way,” Goodson said in a 2015 interview. “How can we analyze the world's written content to create insights that weren't possible before?” 
Additionally funded by Niklas Zennstrom, Founders Fund, Charles Lho, and Liberty Media, over a period of several years, a founding team of scientists and engineers built Quid, described as an “interactive, visual platform which allowed users to query, map and explore context around terms using a combination of language and semantic processing techniques.” The "fully-baked" Quid was launched in January 2014.  With others, Goodson was awarded a patent for entity performance analysis.  He received a Technology Pioneer from the World Economic Forum on behalf of Quid in China in 2016.

Goodson has lectured at Oxford, Cambridge University, and MIT.

References

External links
Official website 
Quid
The 100 Year Revolution In What It Is to Be Human

1980 births
Living people
Alumni of the University of East Anglia
Alumni of University College, Oxford
British chief executives
British technology company founders